The 1983 Clemson Tigers football team was an American football team that represented Clemson University in the Atlantic Coast Conference (ACC) during the 1983 NCAA Division I-A football season. In its sixth season under head coach Danny Ford, the team compiled a 9–1–1 record (7–0 on the field against conference opponents, but officially 0–0 ), was ranked No. 11 in the final AP Poll, and outscored opponents by a total of 338 to 200. The team played its home games at Memorial Stadium in Clemson, South Carolina.

Clemson was on probation for recruiting violations, and was ineligible for the ACC championship and a bowl bid. As a result, their games against ACC opponents, against whom they were an undefeated 7–0 on the field, did not count in the league standings.

James Farr and James Robinson were the team captains. The team's statistical leaders included quarterback Mike Eppley with 1,410 passing yards, fullback Kevin Mack with 862 rushing yards, Ray Williams with 342 receiving yards, and placekicker Bob Paulling with 90 points scored (18 field goals, 36 extra points).

Schedule

Roster

References

Clemson
Clemson Tigers football seasons
Clemson Tigers football